Dhobaghat -- also called Udayapurkot --- is a village and Village Development Committee in Pyuthan, a Middle Hills district of Rapti Zone, western Nepal.

Etymology

dhoba - washing clothing.
ghat - shore or bank of a river; stone platform or steps on a river bank 
Thus: place by river for washing clothes.

udaya- rising, ascent, dawning.
pur- town or city.
kot- guardroom, prison, police station.
Thus: Dawn city police post

Villages in VDC

References

External links
UN map of VDC boundaries, water features and roads in Pyuthan District

Populated places in Pyuthan District